Laura Miloš (born 20 October 1994) is a Croatian volleyball player. She plays as outside hitter for French club Saint-Cloud Paris SF.

International career 
She is a member of the Croatia women's national volleyball team. She competed at the 2021 Women's European Volleyball League, winning a silver medal.

References

External links
Laura Miloš at CEV.eu

1994 births
Living people
Croatian women's volleyball players
People from Poreč
Expatriate volleyball players in Belgium
Expatriate volleyball players in France
Competitors at the 2013 Mediterranean Games
Mediterranean Games bronze medalists for Croatia
Mediterranean Games medalists in volleyball